Richaud Jeron-Felix Pack (born October 17, 1992) is an American professional basketball player who last played for Aris Thessaloniki of the Greek Basket League.

College career
As a redshirt junior at North Carolina A&T, Pack averaged 17.0 points and 4.6 rebounds per game. Following the season, he transferred to Maryland as a graduate transfer. As a senior, Pack averaged 5.8 points, 3.3 rebounds and 1.2 assists per game.

Professional career

ETHA Engomis (2015–2016)
In September 2015, Pack signed a deal with the Cypriot basketball team Michelin ETHA Engomis. In his first professional game, he recorded 15 points to go along with 5 rebounds in a losing effort to APOEL.

Arnetx Zornotza (2017–2018)
During the 2017-18 season Pack played for Arnetx Zornotza of the LEB Silver and averaged 20.4 points, 2.8 rebounds, and 2.3 assists per game.

BC Vienna (2020–2021)
On September 22, 2020, the Austrian basketball team BC Vienna signed Pack. On December 28, 2020, Pack scored a career-high 55 points in a 104-101 OT win over Arkadia Lions. His 55 points set a new single-game record for most points scored in a single game in Austrian Basketball Superliga history.  After scoring his career-high, he scored 38 points in a 96-89 win over the Kapfenberg Bulls.

Hapoel Afula (2021–2022)
On August 10, 2021, Pack signed with Hapoel Afula of the Israeli National League. He averaged 22.3 points, 3.7 rebounds, 2.7 assists, and 1.3 steals per game.

Hapoel Migdal HaEmek (2022)
On February 22, 2022, Pack signed with Hapoel Migdal HaEmek of the Israeli National League. He lead the national league in scoring with 24.4 points per game. The following season, he signed with Hapoel Beer Sheva/Dimona in the Israeli Winner league. He appeared in one game scoring 8 points and 6 rebounds in 10 minutes of play.

Hapoel Be'er Sheva (2022)
On September 20, 2022, he signed with Hapoel Be'er Sheva of the Israeli Basketball Premier League.

Aris Thessaloniki (2022–2023)
On November 7, 2022, Pack moved to Greek club Aris.

Career statistics 

|-
| align="left" |  2015–16
| align="left" | Michelin ETHA Engomis
| Cypriot League
| 21 || 34.3 || .461 || .373 || .849 || 2.7 || 1.1 || 1.1 || .1 || 16.8
|-
| align="left" |  2015–16
| align="left" | Michelin ETHA Engomis
| EuroCup
| 6 || 33.0 || .377 || .400 || .909 || 2.0 || 1.0 || .8 || .0 || 11.3
|-
| align="left" |  2017–18
| align="left" | Ametx Zornotza
| LEB Plata
| 33 || 29.0 || .483 || .347 || .789 || 2.8 || 2.3 || 1.2 || .2 || 20.4
|-
| align="left" |  2018–19
| align="left" | Menorca Bàsquet
| LEB Plata
| 33 || 26.7 || .502 || .317 || .672 || 3.2 || 1.6 || .9 || .2 || 13.6
|-
| align="left" |  2019–20
| align="left" | UU Korihait
| Korisliiga
| 18 || 30.5 || .515 || .367 || .902 || 2.5 || 1.7 || 1.1 || .1 || 17.9
|-
| align="left" |  2020–21
| align="left" | BC Hallman Vienna
| Austrian League
| 22 || 34.0 || .453 || .388 || .858 || 3.4 || 5.3 || .9 || .0 || 23.8
|-
| align="left" |  2021–22
| align="left" | Hapoel Afula
| Israeli National League
| 3 || 32.0 || .409 || .385 || .839 || 3.7 || 2.7 || 1.3 || .0 || 22.3
|-
|-class=sortbottom
| align="center" colspan=2 | Career
| All Leagues
| 136 || 30.5 || .476 || .361 || .808 || 2.9 || 2.3 || 1.0 || .1 || 18.0

References

External Links
Eurobasket.com profile
RealGM.com profile
Maryland Terrapins bio

1992 births
Living people
American expatriate basketball people in Austria
American expatriate basketball people in Cyprus
American expatriate basketball people in Finland
American expatriate basketball people in Greece
American expatriate basketball people in Israel
American expatriate basketball people in Spain
American men's basketball players
Aris B.C. players
Basketball players from Michigan
FIU Panthers men's basketball
Maryland Terrapins men's basketball players
Menorca Bàsquet players
North Carolina A&T Aggies men's basketball players
People from Birmingham, Michigan
Shooting guards